Edward Griffin (died 16 December 1569) of Dingley, Northamptonshire was an English landowner and lawyer. He was Solicitor General from 1545 to 1552 and Attorney General from 1552 to 1558.

He was the second son of Sir Nicholas Griffin (1476 – 1509) of Braybrooke, Northamptonshire and his second wife, Alice Thornborough, daughter of John Thornborough of Hampshire. His elder brother was Sir Thomas Griffin (1496 – 1566) of Braybrooke who married Jane Newton, daughter of Richard Newton of Court of Wick, in Yatton, Somerset.

Following a family tradition, he was admitted as a student to Lincoln's Inn and was Autumn Reader in 1537. He was elected one of the Governors of Lincoln's Inn in 1540. He was Solicitor General from 18 June 1545, during the reign of Henry VIII and Edward VI. He was appointed Attorney General on 21 May 1552 and continued in that role under Mary I. A devout Catholic, he was removed from office on the accession of Elizabeth I.

Griffin acquired an existing house, a Preceptory of the Knights Hospitallers, at Dingley, Northamptonshire at the dissolution of the monasteries, and rebuilt it in the 1550s. The porch of Dingley Hall is carved with the date 1558 and the initials of Griffin and his second wife, and other inscriptions.

Marriages and children
He married three times.

First, in 1535, Elizabeth Palmer, daughter of Robert Palmer of Bowden, Northamptonshire, and Grace Coste, with whom he had a son and four daughters:
 Sir Edward Griffin (d. 1620), married Lucy Conyers (d. 1620) at Wakerley in 1569, with whom he had two sons and three daughters:
 Sir Thomas Griffin (1580 – 1615)
 Sir Edward Griffin (1587 – 1681)  
 Frances Griffin, married Sir Gregory Cromwell, a son of Henry Cromwell, 2nd Baron Cromwell
 Elizabeth Griffin, who married Cecil Hall of Grantham, Lincolnshire, eldest son of Arthur Hall.
Anne Griffin, who married Sir William Villiers of Brooksby.
 Grace Griffin married Simon Norwich of Brampton Ash, Northamptonshire.
 Jane Griffin (d. 1588) married Henry Keble of Humberston, Leicestershire.
 Margaret Griffin married William Plumpton.
 Mary Griffin married Edward Conyers, brother of Reginald Conyers of Wakerley, Northamptonshire.

Second: Anne Smith, daughter of John Smith, Baron of the Exchequer, with whom he had a daughter:
 Anne Griffin.

Third: Elizabeth Chamber, daughter of Geoffrey Chamber of Stanmore, Middlesex, and widow of Sir Walter Stonor (d. 1551) and Reginald Conyers (d. 1560), with whom he had a son:
 Sir Rice Griffin of Bickmarsh, who married Margaret Throckmorton (d. 1615), daughter of Thomas Throckmorton of Coughton, Warwickshire:
 Edward Griffen (d. 1659) of Bickmarsh, father of Nicholas Griffin (d. 1644), who married Anne Lingen (d. 1660) of Stoke Edith.

Gallery

Death and burial
Edward Griffin died on 16 December 1569 and was buried near the chancel in the parish church at Dingley. He was succeeded by his son, Edward, aged 20 years 5 months and 13 days. His widow married, by 28 August 1572, Oliver St John of Bletsoe. 
It is not known for whom the Griffin monument (dated c. 1565-70 by Pevsner) in Braybrooke church was erected in English renaissance style, "but it is a fine example of its kind."

References

Sources

External links
Will of Edward Griffyn or Griffin of Dingley, Northamptonshire The National Archives
Braybrooke, All Saints: Medieval Church in Baybrooke 

16th-century English people
1569 deaths
People from Northamptonshire
16th-century English lawyers
Solicitors General for England and Wales
Attorneys General for England and Wales